Nanook, in Inuit mythology, is  the master of bears.

Nanook, Nanuk, or Nanuq may also refer to:

Art, entertainment, and media
Nanook (band), Greenlandic pop rock band
Nanook (TV series), whose title character is named Nanook
 Nanook of the North (1922), a film by Robert Flaherty, often considered the first formal feature-length documentary
 Nanook, Corey Haim's dog in the film The Lost Boys (1987)
 "Nanook Rubs It", a song by Frank Zappa on the album Apostrophe (1974)
 Nanoq Media, a company in Greenland

Toys
 Nanook, the name of a Beanie Baby
 Nanook, the name of a Beanie Buddy

Places
 Nanook, a Viking settlement and archaeological site on Baffin Island
 Nanuk, Iran, a village in Kerman Province, Iran
 Nanook River, Victoria Island, Canada
 Nanook or Nanuk, alternate names of Menukin, a village in Kerman Province, Iran
 Nanuk-e Bala, alternate name of Naniz-e Olya, a village in Kerman Province, Iran
 Nanoq, a museum in Jakobstad, Finland

Military
 Operation Nanook, various military operations
 Operation Nanook (1946), an Arctic expedition undertaken by the US Navy in 1946
 Operation Nanook (Canada), annual Arctic exercise by Canada's Maritime Command and Canada's Coast Guard
 Operation Nanook (2007), annual Arctic exercise by Canada's Maritime Command and Canada's Coast Guard
 Operation Nanook (2008), annual Arctic exercise by Canada's Maritime Command and Canada's Coast Guard
 Operation Nanook (2009), annual Arctic exercise by Canada's Maritime Command and Canada's Coast Guard
 Operation Nanook (2010), annual Arctic exercise by Canada's Maritime Command and Canada's Coast Guard
 Operation Nanook (2011), annual Arctic exercise by Canada's Maritime Command and Canada's Coast Guard
 Operation Nanook (2012), annual Arctic exercise by Canada's Maritime Command and Canada's Coast Guard
 Operation Nanook (2014), annual Arctic exercise by Canada's Maritime Command and Canada's Coast Guard
 Operation Nanook (2016), annual Arctic exercise by Canada's Maritime Command and Canada's Coast Guard
 Nanuk Remotely Controlled Weapon Station
Project Nanook, US reconnaissance project

Sports
 Nanook, a stylized polar bear mascot for:
 Alaska Nanooks, the University of Alaska Fairbanks sports teams
 Edmonton Eskimos, of the Canadian Football League
 University of Alaska Fairbanks

Other uses
 Nanook AA/FA Fuel Altered
 Nanok East Greenland Fishing Company, a Danish company in Greenland